Nestos may refer to:
Nestos (municipality), a municipality in Greece
Nestos (river), a river in Bulgaria and Greece
Nestos Chrysoupoli F.C., a Greek football club
Ragnvald Nestos (1877–1942), American politician